Acebedo is a village in Álava, Spain. It is part of the municipality of Valdegovía.

Populated places in Álava
Towns in Spain